Hanan is a surname of Semitic origin. Notable people with the surname include:

 Harry Hanan (1916–1982), British cartoonist
 Josiah Hanan (1868–1954), New Zealand politician
 Maurice Hanan, the namesake of the Hanan grid, a geometrical construction
 Peter Hanan (1915–2008), New Zealand swimmer
 Ralph Hanan (1909–1969), New Zealand politician, nephew of Josiah
 Elizabeth Hanan (1937- present), New Zealand local politician